The resident population in Campania is 5,624,260 inhabitants as of 31 December 2020, which corresponds to 9.6% of the Italian population. The male population on 1 January 2015 reached 2,848,043 units and constituted 48.6% of the population of Campania. The female population was made up of 3,013,486 units and constituted 51.4% of the regional population. As of 1 January 2020, the foreign population residing in Campania reached 254,791 people, with an incidence on the regional population of approximately 4%, below the national average of 8%.

Population by province 
The population of Campania by province:

Ethnicities and foreign minorities

Demographic evolution

References 

Campania
Demographics of Italy